Ed Piskor (born July 28, 1982) is an alternative comics artist operating out of Pittsburgh, Pennsylvania. He is a former student of The Kubert School and is best known for his artistic collaborations with underground comics pioneers Harvey Pekar of American Splendor fame, and Jay Lynch who illustrates Garbage Pail Kids. He has a cult following amongst minicomic fans with his series Deviant Funnies and Isolation Chamber.

Life 
Piskor was fascinated by comics throughout his childhood. He was a great fan of mainstream comics such as The Amazing Spider-Man, but his interest in the alternative comics developed rapidly when, at the age of 9, he saw a documentary that had Harvey Pekar reading one of his American Splendor stories.  After finishing high school, he attended the Kubert School for a year, where he met comics artists including  Steve Bissette, Tom Yeates, John Totleben, and Rick Veitch.

His first major comics Deviant Funnies and the autobiographical Isolation Chamber are generally marked with dark humour. In 2003 he started his collaboration with Jay Lynch, and shortly after that with Harvey Pekar. Piskor's first major task with Pekar was illustrating stories of American Splendor: Our Movie Year, which elaborates Pekar's experience after the release of the movie American Splendor. Piskor also illustrated Pekar's graphic novel Macedonia, which was released in 2007 through Villard Books.

Piskor's series Wizzywig deals with Kevin "Boingthump" Phenicle, a young prodigy who becomes fascinated with social engineering, phone phreaking, and eventually computer hacking. As the series progresses, Kevin grows as well as his trials and tribulations with hacking. His endeavors make him legendary; his abilities are feared and also revered by many.  The character from the series, Kevin, is a composite of many well known phreaks and hackers such as Kevin Mitnick, Kevin Poulsen, Joybubbles, and many others. 

In 2009 Piskor collaborated with Pekar on the graphic book The Beats: A Graphic History. The book was published in the UK by Souvenir Press Ltd and drew plaudits from Studs Terkel: “The Beats is as fresh and pertinent as the latest scholarly history, only far more entertaining.” The Beats tells the story of Jack Kerouac, Allen Ginsberg, William S. Burroughs and John Clellon Holmes who became known as The Beat Generation. This cultural revolution is seen through the eyes of the movement's key figures and its minor characters including Diane di Prima, Carolyn Cassady, Philip Lamantia, and others. The startlingly original graphic non-fiction work was highly praised in Vanity Fair: “Editor Paul Buhle’s graphic history The Beats—with riffs from cats such as Harvey Pekar and Trina Robbins—burns like a Roman candle.”

Piskor's Eisner Award winning series, Hip Hop Family Tree, is a historical account of hip hop culture and the  artists that have shaped the genre. In 2018, Piskor has wrote and illustrated X-Men: Grand Design, a mini-series focusing on the history of the X-Men, for Marvel Comics. The first issue of 'X-Men: Grand Design was released in December 2017. Two sequels, X-Men: Grand Design: Second Genesis and X-Men: Grand Design - X-Tinction followed in 2018 and 2019.

Since 2018, Piskor has co-hosted Cartoonist Kayfabe!, a YouTube channel focusing on '90s and independent comics, with fellow Pittsburgh native Jim Rugg.

In 2020 Piskor started serializing a graphic novel titled Red Room on his personal Patreon page, which was published as a physical book in 2021.

Works 
Macedonia, New York, NY. : Villard/Random House, 2007. , 
Wizzywig, Marietta, Ga. : Top Shelf, 2012. , 
Hip Hop Family Tree, Seattle, Washington : Fantagraphics Books, Inc., 2013. , 
X-Men : Grand Design, New York, NY : Marvel Worldwide, Inc., 2018. ,

References

External links 

 
 interview with Rob Clough
 Profile at ninthart.com
 Interview about Macedonia Graphic novel written by Harvey Pekar and Heather Roberson
 Review of Wizzywig Volume 1: Phreak by Brian Heater
 Review of Wizzywig Volume 1: Phreak at Newsarama
 Short comic featured in Smith Mag: “My neighbor the dickhead”

American cartoonists
American comics artists
American comics writers
Underground cartoonists
Eisner Award winners
The Kubert School alumni
People from Homestead, Pennsylvania
Living people
1982 births
American Splendor artists
Writers from Pittsburgh
Artists from Pittsburgh
21st-century American male writers
21st-century American artists